Albert Jean Amateau (April 20, 1889 – February 9, 1996) was a Turkish rabbi, businessman, lawyer, social activist, and denier of the Armenian genocide.

Early years 
Born a Sephardic Jew in Milas, Ottoman Empire (now Turkey), Amateau attended the American International College in İzmir (Smyrna), Turkey. He emigrated to the United States in 1910 to escape conscription after the "Young Turks" revolution of 1908.

Activism 
In the early 1920s, Amateau began a movement to bring more Jews into the workplace and government. He was also involved largely in the affairs of deaf people. After he returned from serving in the army in World War I, Amateau was ordained in 1920 at the Jewish Theological Seminary, and he became the first rabbi of a congregation of the deaf. In 1941, Amateau developed the Albert J. Amateau Foreign Language Service, a business providing translators for lipsync dubbing for motion pictures which continued in operation until 1989. 

An ardent supporter of his homeland of Turkey, Amateau began various Turkish-oriented organizations while residing in the United States. In 1992, at the age of 103, he helped found the American Society of Jewish Friends of Turkey and was named as its president.

Amateau was also an "advocate of peace", and in 1937, he assisted with negotiations between Jews and Arabs of Palestine.

He made a Sworn Statement denying the Armenian genocide in Turkey (1915–1923) to oppose approval of a resolution to recognize the said genocide, introduced by Senator Robert Dole in the United States Senate.

Amateau died in 1996 at the age of 106 years, 9 months, 20 days.

References

1889 births
1996 deaths
American activists
American people of Turkish-Jewish descent
Emigrants from the Ottoman Empire to the United States
Turkish centenarians
Turkish Sephardi Jews
American centenarians
American Sephardic Jews
Men centenarians
Ottoman İzmir/Smyrna
People from Milas
Deniers of the Armenian genocide